Karen Sue Aston (born July 26, 1964 in Benton, Arkansas) is an American basketball player and coach. She is currently the head coach of the UTSA Roadrunners women's basketball team. She has served as the head women's basketball coach at Texas, Charlotte, and North Texas. Aston has a career record of 285-146 (.661). In her 13 seasons as a head coach, Aston’s teams have averaged 22 wins per year and have made a combined 10 postseason appearances.

Aston was one of four finalists for the Naismith Women’s College Coach of the Year award in 2017 and was one of 10 semifinalists for the honor in 2018. She also earned Big 12 Coach of the Year accolades in 2017.

Background 
In her career as a college assistant coach, Aston has served under three coaches in the Naismith Basketball Hall of Fame. As associate head coach at Baylor, she worked for Kim Mulkey; in an earlier stint at Baylor she served under Sonja Hogg. Prior to becoming Baylor's associate head coach, she served eight seasons in the same capacity at The University of Texas at Austin under Jody Conradt.

Charlotte 
Aston was introduced as the 49ers' new head coach on April 27, 2007. She replaced Amanda Butler, who left Charlotte after six seasons (two as head coach) to coach her alma mater, the University of Florida. Aston inherited a 49ers team that had made five consecutive postseason appearances including a WNIT berth in 2007. After a WNIT appearance in 2008, she led the 49ers to the 2009 Atlantic 10 Conference Tournament Title, and an 11th seed in the 2009 NCAA Women's Division I Basketball Tournament. After a run to the final four of the WNIT in 2011, Aston resigned on April 6, 2011 and soon thereafter accepted the head coaching position at North Texas in order to be closer to her family in Arkansas.

North Texas 
On April 11, 2011, Karen Aston was named the sixth head coach of the University of North Texas women's basketball program. She returned to the university where she had coached as an assistant from 1996 to 1998 under longtime UNT head coach Tina Slinker. Aston took over a program that had gone 5–25 the previous year, and tripled that win total her first year with a 15–16 overall record. On February 18, 2012, Aston earned her 100th victory as a head coach.

Texas 
Aston was named the fourth head coach in University of Texas women's basketball history on April 3, 2012. At the University of Texas, Aston led the Longhorns to a 184-83 (.689) record in eight seasons. In her final seven seasons combined at Texas, Aston’s teams averaged 24.6 wins per year, making six NCAA Tournament appearances. From 2015-18, her squads made four consecutive NCAA Sweet 16 showings, marking the first time that had been accomplished at Texas since 1990.  Aston also directed the 2015-16 Longhorns to the program’s first NCAA Elite Eight appearance since 2003. 

Six of Aston’s Texas players (Nneka Enemkpali, Imani McGee-Stafford, Ariel Atkins, Joyner Holmes, Sug Sutton and Charli Collier) were drafted by WNBA teams. Collier was the first pick in the 2021 WNBA Draft. McGee-Stafford (10th) and Atkins (7th) also were selected as first-round picks. As a starter, Atkins helped lead the Washington Mystics to the 2019 WNBA Championship and has earned WNBA All-Defensive Team honors in each of her three seasons. 

Each of Aston's eight teams at Texas ranked in the top-25 nationally in rebounding margin, including three years in the top-five. Her 2017-18 and 2018-19 teams ranked third in the NCAA in rebounding margin. Four of the top-eight single-season team rebounding averages in Texas history came during Aston’s tenure, as did five of the top-nine best seasons in field-goal percentage defense. 

Aston’s prowess as one of the nation’s best recruiters is also well known. Five of the classes she recruited to Texas were ranked among the top-11 in the nation according to ESPN.com, including three top-five classes. Recruits Charli Collier and Joyner Holmes were both No. 2 prospects according to ESPN and were listed as the nation’s top recruits by some services. Aston brought 14 McDonalds All-Americans to Texas during her eight seasons.

Head Coaching Record

References

External links
Karen Aston Official Bio from texassports.com

1964 births
Living people
American women's basketball coaches
Baylor Bears women's basketball coaches
Charlotte 49ers women's basketball coaches
North Texas Mean Green women's basketball coaches
People from Benton, Arkansas
Texas Longhorns women's basketball coaches
University of Arkansas at Little Rock alumni
UTSA Roadrunners women's basketball coaches
Basketball coaches from Arkansas
Basketball players from Arkansas